The rubberlip grunt (Plectorhinchus mediterraneus) is a species of marine ray-finned fish, a sweetlips belonging to the subfamily Plectorhinchinae, one of two subfamilies in the family Haemulidae, the grunts. It is native to the eastern Atlantic Ocean.

Description
The rubberlip grunt has an oblong compressed body and has a standard length which is around two and a half times its depth. The head is relatively small with a long snout and a relatively small, slightly oblique mouth which has moderately thick lips. The continuous dorsal fin has 10-13 spines and 17-20 soft rays while the anal fin contains 3 spines and 8-9 soft rays. The caudal fin is emarginate and has pointed lobes. They are largely greyish-brown in colour, marked with paler stripes and with a dark, rather unclear, stripe starting immediately underneath the soft-rayed part of the dorsal fin and extending back to the caudal peduncle. The abdomen is paler, almost white.

Distribution
The rubbberlip grunt is found in the eastern Atlantic Ocean and the western Mediterranean Sea. In the eastern Atlantic its range extends from southern Portugal to central Namibia, including São Tomé and Príncipe but it is absent from the Cape Verde Islands, the Azores or Madeira and its presence in the Canary Islands is considered doubtful. In the western Mediterranean reaches the Adriatic Sea and may be present in Greece and Egyptian but these identifications are considered to be doubtful, the records may refer to misidentified Pomadasys stridens, a Lessepsian migrant from the Red Sea into the Mediterranean via the Suez Canal.

Habitat and biology
It feeds on both zooplankton and benthic animals. It is an oviparous species which spawns as distinct pairs.

Systematics
The rubberlip grunt was first formally described in 1850 as Diagramma mediterraneum by the French zoologist Antoine Alphonse Guichenot with the type locality being given as Algeria. The specific name mediterraneus means "of the Mediterranean" and refers to its presence in that sea.

Utilisation
The rubberlip grunt is an abundant species which can make up 40% of the catch of trawlers in some areas. The methods used to catch this species includes pelagic and bottom trawls, fixed bottom nets and kook and line. The catch is either sold fresh or preserved by drying or salting.

References

Fish described in 1850
Rubberlip grunt